Perineura is a genus of sawflies belonging to the family Tenthredinidae.

The species of this genus are found in Europe and Northern America.

Species:
 Perineura rubi (Panzer, 1805)
 Perineura turbata Rohwer

References

Tenthredinidae
Sawfly genera